Kevin Garcia (born 12 August 1982) is a professional English darts player who mainly plays in Professional Darts Corporation events.

He plays in PDC Challenge Tour events, and thanks to his record in early 2019, he was able to qualify for the 2019 Czech Darts Open in Prague, where he lost 6–0 to Jermaine Wattimena in the first round.

References

External links

1982 births
Living people
English darts players
People from St Helens, Merseyside